Lednica may refer to:

Lednica (lake) in western Poland, site of annual religious gatherings
Lednica Landscape Park, a protected area in the region of Lednica lake
Lednica, Opole Voivodeship (south-west Poland)
Lednica, Púchov District, a village and municipality in Slovakia
Lednica 2000, a yearly Catholic youth meeting

See also
Lednice